M. R. SrinivasaMurthy (Mysuru Ramachandraraya Srinivasamurthy or M.R.Sri) (28 August 1892 – 16 November 1953) was a Kannada fiction and non fiction writer.

Early life and education 
Srinivasamurthy was born on 28 August 1892 in Mysuru. His father Ramachandraraya who was working in district office, and mother is Savitramma. He received his BA from Central College, Bengaluru in 1915.
He served as teacher, education inspector, district education officer, and retired in 1947. 
He was a famous orator, good teacher, educationist.

Literature work 
He was president of 33rd Kannada Sahitya Sammelana held on 1950 in Solapur. He was a member of Kannada Sahitya Parishat and editor of Kannada news letter from the Parishat from 1950 to 1952 He has written 12 dramas and 3 novels. Two of his novels have become movies.

Plays
Dharma Duranta ಧರ್ಮದುರಂತ
Naagareeka
Kanteerava Vijaya

Novels
Saavitri
Mahaatyaaga
Rangannana Kanasina Dinagalu

Research
Bhakti Bhandaari Basavanna
Vachana dharmasaara

Science articles
Upaadyayara Aarogya Shaastra (Study of Teachers Health)
Magnetism 
Electricity

References

Kannada-language writers
1892 births
1953 deaths
Indian male novelists
Writers from Mysore
Kannada people
Indian male dramatists and playwrights
Novelists from Karnataka